Rajmund Stachurski (21 June 1935 – 10 April 2004) was a Polish sports shooter. He competed at the 1968 Summer Olympics and the 1972 Summer Olympics.

References

1935 births
2004 deaths
Polish male sport shooters
Olympic shooters of Poland
Shooters at the 1968 Summer Olympics
Shooters at the 1972 Summer Olympics
Sportspeople from Kielce
20th-century Polish people